Bnei Yehuda (lit. Sons of Yehuda) may refer to:

Bnei Yehuda, Golan Heights, a moshav on the Golan Heights
Bnei Yehuda Tel Aviv F.C., a football club from Tel Aviv